The Stausee Solis ("Solis reservoir") is a reservoir on the Albula river, located between Alvaschein, Stierva and Tiefencastel, in the canton of Graubünden.

Geography 

It was built in 1986 by the Electric Power Company of Zurich (ewz). A dam of  height and a crown length of  holds back the water in the lake. The water in the reservoir is used for energy production further downstream in the power plants Sils and Rothenbrunnen. This dam is used as daily storage.

Because of the small size of the lake compared with its catchment area sediment aggregation plays an important role. In 2012 a sediment bypass tunnel (SBT) was built, which operates only a few days every year, but eliminates sedimentation in the reservoir almost completely. But there are many investigations due to abrasion in the tunnel to make.

The dam is located just east of the Solis Viaduct of the Albula Railway.

See also
List of mountain lakes of Switzerland

References

Lakes of Graubünden
Reservoirs in Switzerland